Lesbians on the Loose (LOTL) was a lesbian magazine published in Australia. It first appeared in Sydney in January 1990. It covered news, politics, social issues, and included celebrity interviews and stories on entertainment, pop culture, style and travel.

History and profile
Lesbians on the Loose was first published by Frances Rand and Jackie Scherer with an initial run of 1000 copies.

Originally a monthly publication, it set out to keep lesbians informed about activities and events within the community. Scherer left soon after issue one with Rand continuing as publisher until she was joined by Barbara Farrelly in 1994. The magazine grew rapidly reaching a circulation of 20,000 copies by the end of the decade, making it the most read lesbian magazine in Australia. 

Rand and Farrelly sold the magazine to Silke Bader in 1998, and Bader continued to be the publisher until at least 2019. 

In 2010, Silke Bader bought Curve magazine, a US lesbian magazine. The back office of Lesbians on the Loose was merged with Curve magazine, and publishing continued under two separate titles. The magazines usually shared the cover story but published country-related topics in the relevant title.

In 2019 the magazines were separated again and the publisher sold Curve magazine (2020) to its original US owner. LOTL was relaunched and published five more issues in 2021 before it stopped print production. At the end of 2021, LOTL launched its video podcast Queer Conversation.

Digitisation 
The first nine years have been digitised on the National Library of Australia's archive, Trove.

There is also a complete digital archive available on lotl.com/archive.

In the media 
Episode 3 of ABC Television documentary series Kweens of the Queer Underground tells the story of LOTL.

See also
 Lesbian feminism
 List of lesbian periodicals
 List of LGBT periodicals

References

External links
 
  Lesbians on the Loose  at National Library of Australia - Trove 

1990 establishments in Australia
Lesbian culture in Australia
LGBT-related magazines published in Australia
Magazines established in 1990
Magazines published in Sydney
Monthly magazines published in Australia
Quarterly magazines published in Australia
Lesbian-related magazines